Ryan Duncan (born July 14, 1985) is a Canadian professional ice hockey forward. He is currently an unrestricted free agent having last played for EC Red Bull Salzburg of the Austrian Hockey League (EBEL).

Playing career
Duncan played four seasons with the University of North Dakota Fighting Sioux where in 2007, he won the Hobey Baker Award and was named the WCHA Player of the Year. Undrafted, Duncan signed an Amateur Tryout Contract (ATO) with the New York Islanders on April 8, 2009, and played two games for their American Hockey League affiliate, the Bridgeport Sound Tigers.

He signed with EC Red Bull Salzburg in Austria on May 12, 2009. In two seasons with Salzburg, Duncan mirrored each year in claiming the Austrian Championship and finishing as the Red Bulls second leading scorer.

On September 7, 2011, Duncan returned to North American and signed a one-year deal with AHL club, the Portland Pirates. He scored 36 points in 64 games during the 2011–12 season, but remained without an NHL offer.

On April 19, 2012, he signed a one-year contract for a second tenure in the Austrian League with EC Red Bull Salzburg.

On July 4, 2013, Duncan signed a contract in a neighbouring league in Germany, on a one-year deal with EHC Red Bull München of the Deutsche Eishockey Liga. In the 2013–14 season, Duncan established a scoring role in team and contributed with 12 goals and 32 points in 49 games.

On June 17, 2014, Duncan opted to remain within the Red Bull sponsored teams, in returning to Salzburg for a third time, on a one-year contract.

Career statistics

Awards and honors

References

External links

Living people
1985 births
Bridgeport Sound Tigers players
Canadian ice hockey forwards
EC Red Bull Salzburg players
EHC München players
North Dakota Fighting Hawks men's ice hockey players
Hobey Baker Award winners
Salmon Arm Silverbacks players
Ice hockey people from Calgary
Portland Pirates players
Canadian expatriate ice hockey players in Austria
Canadian expatriate ice hockey players in Germany
AHCA Division I men's ice hockey All-Americans